, also known as Cat God, is a Japanese manga series written and illustrated by Flipflops about a cat goddess that lives in an antique shop. An anime television adaptation by AIC PLUS+ aired in Japan between July and September 2011 and has been licensed in North America by NIS America.

Plot
Nekogami Yaoyorozu is a story about a Cat God named Mayu who has been stripped of her rank and powers and banished from Takama-ga-hara to live on Earth for illegal gambling. She ends up living in an antique shop called Yaoyorozudou with a girl called Yuzu. The story revolves around the various antics the two get up to as they meet with various other gods and creatures from Japanese Mythology.

Characters

Mayu is a diminutive Cat God (Nekogami) who has the power to find lost items using a magical scroll. Mayu is a really lazy Cat God, who likes to relax at home, play video games and of course sleep and eat (mostly seafood) much like a real cat. She also likes to tease everybody, and does anything for her games. She also has a gambling addiction which got her kicked out Takamagahara and stripped of her divine powers by her mother. Despite that she is very competent as a Cat God when she needs to be and is genuinely caring of others both her friends and of things there besides resulting her in being well loved by the people of her town. Mayu has orange-yellow hair, brown eyes and cat ears. She has two tails which caused Yuzu to confuse her for a Nekomata when they first met.

Yuzu is the owner of Yaoyorozudou, a Japanese antique shop she inherited from her father, and she lives together with Mayu. She has lavender colored hair and green eyes and always wears a white apron. Yuzu is very positive and all the gods like her. Yuzu rarely gets angry, but when she does she gets a little scary. Even though Yuzu doesn't like Mayu's annoying attitude, she still cares about her. The two met when the ghost of her dead cat Kotetsu convinced Mayu to help Yuzu with her grief over his death. She possesses no mystical power but has an incredible natural talent for discerning the quality and authenticity of antique Japanese items.

A black haired Cat God, who has also grey eyes. Sasana is Mayu's fiancé, the reason for this being their fathers, who decided Sasana and Mayu would make a good 'couple' without considering the other child's gender. Sasana is usually content, but when she's close to Mayu she's really happy, calling her 'Mayu-sama' and talking always about how she is ready for marriage. She wields a magical wooden sword called Swordfish which transforms from the pick of a Shamisen. She maintains a fierce rivalry with Meiko for Mayu's love.

Meiko is a blonde "princess" with grayish-blue eyes. She is grand-daughter of the god Daikokuten and wields his magical golden hammer which is not only extremely powerful but can also create gold coins like in legend. Just like Sasana, she likes Mayu a lot, tracing back to when they were kids and Meiko had no friends and Mayu invited her to play with her and Sasana, but she refused. But Mayu told her that she could come anytime she wanted to, which left a strong impression on Meiko. Meiko is quick to temper, but also possesses a soft side.

A minor goddess of Cherry Blossoms. She has pink pigtails and is easily the clumsiest of all the main characters. Her portfolio only allows her to control the blossoming of cherry trees and she is generally useless in combat for no-want of effort. She joined Mayu's circle of friends after accidentally mailing a special jar of magical ash used to make cherry trees bloom which Mayu threw away not knowing what it was. Mayu then helped Yoshino find it again and bolstered her self-confidence. Yoshino is scared of ghosts.

 A young Fox God in charge of caring for the town's wealth and prosperity. He has a major crush on Yuzu and is something of pervert spending much of his time fantasizing about her. He is extremely headstrong and as such is willing to move heaven and earth for his infatuation but is incapable of expressing his feelings even when circumstances don't conspire to thwart him. He enjoys antagonizing Mayu mostly out of jealousy over her closeness to Yuzu and his belief that Mayu is impeding him.

 A God of Poverty and a traveling performance auditor for the gods. She made friends with Yuzu (the latter not knowing Shamo was a Poverty God) through whom she came to conclusion that while chaotic and disorganized the town's gods were sufficiently competent. Following this episode, she frequently returns to hang with the rest of the cast.

Media

Manga
Nekogami Yaoyorozu began its serial run in the July 2007 issue of Champion Red Ichigo, ending in October 2012. The series was published in six compilation volumes.

Audio dramas

Anime
In December 2010, an anime television series based on the manga was announced in Champion Red Ichigo. Produced by AIC PLUS+ under the direction of Hiroaki Sakurai, the anime series aired on AT-X between July 9, 2011 and September 24, 2011 and was simulcast by Crunchyroll. NIS America has licensed the series under the name The Everyday Tales of a Cat God and released it in North America on subtitled DVD and Blu-ray Disc on June 4, 2013.

Episode list

An OVA subtitled "Ohanami Ghostbusters" 27 minutes 19 seconds long was also released March 21, 2012.

See also
Darwin's Game, another manga series by FLIPFLOPs

References

External links
 

2007 manga
2011 Japanese television series debuts
2011 Japanese television series endings
AT-X (TV network) original programming
Akita Shoten manga
Anime International Company
Japanese mythology in anime and manga
Manga series
Seinen manga
Shinto in fiction
Shinto kami in anime and manga
Yōkai in anime and manga